"Ding-a-dong" (original Dutch title: "Ding dinge dong", as it was introduced in the titles when broadcast) is the winning song in the Eurovision Song Contest 1975. The song reached number 1 in both the Swiss and the Norwegian Singles Chart.

History
"Ding-a-dong" was performed first on the performance night (preceding 's The Swarbriggs with "That's What Friends Are For"). The song was the first winner under the now-familiar Eurovision voting system whereby each country awards scores of 1–8, 10 and 12. At the close of voting, it had received 152 points, placing first in a field of nineteen. As the first song performed during the evening, the victory ran contrary to the fact that success usually went to songs performed later in the broadcast. According to author and historian John Kennedy O'Connor's The Eurovision Song Contest – The Official History, this was the first of three occasions when the first song would win the contest, the second coming the following year in 1976, and the third in 1984.

The song, performed entirely in English, was an up-tempo ode to positive thought; though the song is written entirely in a minor key. The band sings that one should "sing a song that goes ding ding-a-dong" when one is feeling unhappy, and continues "Ding-a-dong every hour, when you pick a flower. Even when your lover is gone, gone, gone." On the night of the Dutch National Song Contest, with the song already having been selected, Albert West and Debbie competed with Teach-In for the honour of performing.

In the original Dutch version the "ding-a-dong" describes the heartbeat of the singer remembering the separation from her lover in the past. As well as "ding-a-dong", the lyrics also contain "bim-bam-bom" representing a fearful heartbeat and "tikke-(tikke)-tak" for the ticking of the clock while waiting for the lover to return:
Is 't lang geleden? Is 't lang geleden? In de zomerzon ging het bim-bam-bom.
Tikke-tak gingen uren, hoelang zou 't duren?

Translation:
Is it long ago? That my heart called you with its ding-ding-a-dong?
Is it long ago? Is it long ago? In the summer sun it went bim-bam-bom.
Tick tock went the hours, how long would it take?

The song reached number 13 in the UK Singles Chart and Teach-In also recorded the song in German as "Ding ding-a-dong".

Charts

Weekly charts

Year-end charts

Covers

beFour cover

"Ding-a-Dong" was also recorded by German band beFour for their fourth studio album Friends 4 Ever and released as the second single in Germany, Austria and Switzerland.

Charts

Other covers
 Edwyn Collins did a cover of the song for Eurotrash. 

 Russian musicians Alyona Apina and Murat Nasyrov recorded "" ("Lunnyje nochi", "Moonlight nights") to the melody of "Ding-a-Dong" in 1997.

 Bessy Argyraki sang a cover in Greek, included in her LP Robert & Bessie (1975).

 Füsun Önal covered this song as "Söyleyin Arkadaşlar" ("Tell me friends") in Turkish, included in her first LP Alo... Ben Füsun (1975).

 Ayla Algan covered this song as "Dünya Tersine Dönse" ("If the world turns back") in Turkish, included in firstly her 45rpm Dünya Tersine Dönse/Sen De Katıl Bize (1975), laterly in her second LP after Yunus Emre and the first commercial one Ayla Algan (1976).

 András Csonka recorded a Hungarian language version "Ding Dong" in 2001.

References

External links
Stockholm 1975 - Eurovision Song Contest
Detailed info and lyrics, Diggiloo Thrush, "Ding-A-Dong"

BeFour songs
CNR Music singles
Eurovision Song Contest winning songs
Eurovision songs of 1975
Eurovision songs of the Netherlands
Number-one singles in Norway
Number-one singles in Switzerland
Songs written by Eddy Ouwens
1975 singles
1975 songs
2009 singles